The City of Kansas City was a streamlined passenger train operated by the Wabash Railroad and its successor the Norfolk and Western Railway between St. Louis and Kansas City, Missouri. It operated from 1947 to 1968. At the time of its introduction it was the only streamliner which operated entirely within the state of Missouri.

History 
The City of Kansas City commenced operating on November 26, 1947, and made a daily  round trip schedule between St. Louis and Kansas City. At the time of its introduction it was the only streamliner which operated entirely within the state of Missouri. General Omar Bradley, a native Missourian who as a young man had worked on the Wabash, christened the new train.

Primarily a daylight train, #3 departed St. Louis at 8:45am, and arrived in KC at 2:15pm. The consist was then turned around and readied for the eastbound trip as #12, departing KC at 3:55pm, and arriving in St. Louis at 9:45pm.

The Norfolk and Western Railway leased the Wabash in 1964 but did not discontinue the City of Kansas City until February 1968.

Equipment 

The American Car and Foundry Company built the original seven-car consist in their St. Charles, Missouri plant in the suburbs of St. Louis. Cars included a baggage car, baggage-mail car, two 58-seat coaches, a lunch counter-coach, a dining car, and a parlor-observation car. The interior of the parlor-observation car was designed according to Pullman Plan #9001 and Pullman managed the car, as it did with all the Wabash parlor cars.

References 

Passenger trains of the Wabash Railroad
Named passenger trains of the United States
Railway services introduced in 1947
Passenger rail transportation in Missouri
Railway services discontinued in 1968